James Kellick (24 August 1840 – 8 August 1926) was an Australian cricketer. He played one first-class match for New South Wales in 1868/69.

See also
 List of New South Wales representative cricketers

References

External links
 

1840 births
1926 deaths
Australian cricketers
New South Wales cricketers
Cricketers from Sydney